Soyuzzoloto Residential House is a constructivist building in Tsentralny City District of Novosibirsk, Russia. It is located on the corner of Kamenskaya and Oktyabrskaya streets. The building was constructed in 1932. Architects: A. I. Bobrov, B. A. Gordeyev.

History
The building was built by A. I. Bobrov and was reconstructed by B. A. Gordeyev in the following years.

See also
 Aeroflot House
 Polyclinic No. 1
 Rabochaya Pyatiletka

References

Tsentralny City District, Novosibirsk
Buildings and structures in Novosibirsk
Houses completed in 1932
Constructivist architecture
Cultural heritage monuments of regional significance in Novosibirsk Oblast